Djamel Ibouzidène (born January 20, 1994) is an Algerian footballer who plays for MC Oran in the Algerian Ligue Professionnelle 1.

On March 3, 2017, Ibouzidène made his professional debut for ES Sétif as a second-half substitute in a league match against RC Relizane.

Honours
ES Sétif
 Algerian Ligue Professionnelle 1 (1): 2016–17

References

External links
 

1994 births
Algeria youth international footballers
Algerian expatriates in France
Algerian footballers
Algerian Ligue Professionnelle 1 players
Championnat National players
Expatriate footballers in France
Living people
Olympique Noisy-le-Sec players
Paradou AC players
Paris FC players
People from Oran
Association football defenders
ES Sétif players
AS Aïn M'lila players
WA Tlemcen players
MC Oran players
21st-century Algerian people